Hebron is a Canadian rural community in Prince County, Prince Edward Island. It is located in the township of Lot 8, Prince Edward Island, south of O'Leary.

The community is named for the biblical city of Hebron.

References

External links
 Government of PEI profile

Communities in Prince County, Prince Edward Island